Sons of Ham was a 1900 musical staged in the United States. Will Marion Cook wrote the music and Jesse A. Shipp the book. It was a farce, with Bert Williams and George Walker portraying two young men mistaken for twin heirs.

It opened October 15, 1900 at the Star Theatre and closed October 20, 1900 after 8 performances. It also played April 29, 1901 at the Grand Opera House and closed May 4, 1901 after 8 performances.

Bert Williams and George Walker were photographed performing their characters in the show. The show succeeded their first together, A Lucky Coon. The title of the show, a biblical reference, caused some controversy and protest. Their show In Dahomey followed.

References

African-American theatre